Chambonas may refer to:

 Chambonas, a commune in the Ardèche department in southern France
 La Garde de Chambonas, the name of a French family
 Victor Scipion Charles Auguste de La Garde de Chambonas, the name of a French foreign minister of Louis XVI
 Château de Chambonas , a medieval castle